Josiel is a given name. It may refer to:

 Josiel (footballer, born 1980), Josiel da Rocha, Brazilian football striker
 Josiel Núñez (born 1993), Panamanian football midfielder
 Josiel (footballer, born 1999), Josiel Ortega Arruda, Brazilian football forward

See also
 Jô (footballer, born 1988), Josiel Alves de Oliveira, Brazilian football winger